Tudorella sulcata is a species of land snail which has an operculum, a terrestrial gastropod mollusk in the family Pomatiidae.

Distribution 
This species stricto sensu (T. s. sulcata) occurs in Algeria, France, Portugal and lato sensu (Tudorella sp. pl.) also in Morocco, Spain, Sardinia, Malta Tunisia and Sicily.

References

Further reading 
 Jesse R., Véla E. & Pfenninger M. (2011). "Phylogeography of a Land Snail Suggests Trans-Mediterranean Neolithic Transport". PLoS ONE 6(6): e20734. .
  Pavon D. (2005). "Tudorella sulcata sulcata (Draparnaud 1805) (Gastropoda: Pomatiidae), une espèce patrimoniale de la malacofaune francaise. Biocosme mesogéen 21: 155-170 (dated 2004, published in 2005).
  Véla E., Magnin F., Pavon D. & Pfenninger M. (2008). "Phylogénie moléculaire et données paléobiogéographiques sur le gastéropode terrestre Tudorella sulcata (Draparnaud, 1805) en France et en Algérie orientale". Geodiversitas 30(1): 233–246.

External links 
 Animal Base info

Pomatiidae
Gastropods described in 1805